Jakarta Kota Station (station code: JAKK) is a railway station, located in the old city core of Kota, Jakarta,  Indonesia.

The station was named Batavia Zuid (or South Batavia) until the beginning of the 20th century. The station was also popularly known as the Beos Station as an abbreviation of the station's former owner Bataviasche Oosterspoorweg Maatschapij (BOS).

Jakarta Kota Station serves as a main station, along with Gambir Station, Jatinegara Station, and Pasar Senen Station, for several intercity train lines across Java island. This station also serves two of the five KRL Commuterline train lines, which operate in the Jakarta metropolitan area.

History

The name Beos on the station's nickname has many versions. First, the name Beos refers to the owner of the Batavia station Bataviasche Oosterspoorweg Maatschapij (Batavia Eastern Railway Company or BOS), which was at the same location before it was demolished. This company was a private railway company that connects Batavia with Kedunggedeh. On another version, Beos comes from the word Batavia En Omstreken, which means "Batavia and its Surroundings", which comes from the station's function as a rail transportation center that connects Batavia with other cities such as Bekassie (Bekasi), Buitenzorg (Bogor), Parijs van Java (Bandung), Karavam (Karawang), and others.

Actually, there is still another name for this Jakarta Kota Station, namely Batavia Zuid which means South Batavia Station. This name arose because at the end of the 19th century, Batavia already had more than two train stations. One of them is the Batavia Noord Station (North Batavia) which is located south of the present-day Jakarta History Museum. Batavia Noord originally belonged to the Nederlandsch-Indische Spoorweg Maatschappij railway company, and was the terminus for the Batavia-Buitenzorg line. In 1913 the Batavia-Buitenzorg line was sold to the Dutch East Indies government and managed by the Staatsspoorwegen. At that time the Jatinegara and Tanjung Priok areas were not yet part of the Batavian gemeente.

The first station was built in 1887 by the BOS, a private railway company. The station was named Batavia Zuid (South Batavia) to distinguish it from the older Batavia Noord (North Batavia) station (owned by the Nederlandsch-Indische Spoorweg Maatschappij, another private railway company), which was situated a small distance to the north, directly behind the former city hall. The public railway company Staatsspoorwegen acquired both the southern and northern station in 1898 and 1913 respectively.

The southern BOS station was closed in 1923, and was rebuilt between 1926 and 1929, during which all rail services were temporarily taken over by the Batavia North station. The station building was designed in 1927-1928 by the architects Asselbergs, Frans Johan Louwrens Ghijsels, and Hes from the architectural company Algemeen Ingenieurs-en Architectenbureau (AIA) in Batavia. During construction in 1928-1929 concrete from the Hollandsche Beton Maatschappij ("Dutch Concrete Company") was used. The main building was designed with 12 railway tracks, designated to connect Batavia with Buitenzorg, the port of Tandjoeng Priok, and the port of Merak near the Sunda Strait with a ferry connecting Western Java with Southern Sumatra. The new and current building was officially opened on 8 October 1929 with a private ceremony by the company staff. All rail services to the old city were then reassigned to the new southern station, while the remaining northern station was demolished.

The new station was nicknamed BEOS after the previous station owners, the BOS. Officially named station Batavia Stad ("Batavia City station"), it is located at the Stationsplein ("Station square") in Batavia Benedenstad ("Downtown Batavia"), nowadays Jalan Stasiun Kota Barat. 

Beos Station is Ghijsels' masterpiece known as the Het Indische Bouwen expression, which is a combination of western modern structures and techniques combined with local traditional forms. With a thick art deco dressing, this Ghijsels design seems simple even though it has a high taste. According to ancient Greek philosophy, simplicity is the shortest path to beauty.

Jakarta Kota Station was finally designated as a cultural heritage through Special Capital Region of Jakarta Governor Decree No. 475 in 1993. Although it is still functioning, there are still some corners that are not well maintained. Its existence began to be disturbed by the news of the construction of a shopping mall on top of the station building. Likewise, cleanliness is not maintained properly, trash is scattered on the railroad tracks. In addition, many people who live on either side of the tracks near the station reduce the aesthetic value of this station. Now, Kereta Api Indonesia, through the Preservation Unit for Historical Objects and Buildings, has begun to organize this historic station.

Building and layout

The design of the station by the Dutch architect Frans Johan Louwrens Ghijsels (born 8 September 1882) is a combination of Western Art Deco and local architecture styles.

Jakarta Kota Station is a two-storey station surrounded by streets on three sides with one main entrance and two side entrances. The main entrance and hall are characterized by a barrel vault roof with openings horizontally composed with the top dominated by vertical units (lunettes).

The inside wall of the hall is finished with rough-textured brown ceramic and the outside wall at the bottom of the whole building was covered with green-yellowish plaster. The station floor uses yellow teak and grey wood, and for the platform floor yellow waffle teakwood is used. Jakarta Kota Station has six platforms serving 12 tracks. The platforms are sheltered by canopies supported by steel columns.

Initially, this station had twelve railway lines with tracks 4 and 5 being a double track straight line from and towards Kampung Bandan Bawah–Pasar Senen–Jatinegara, lines 8 and 9 being a double track straight line from and towards Kampung Bandan Atas–Tanjung Priuk, as well as lines 11 and 12 are straight double track elevated tracks from and towards Gambir–Manggarai. However, currently the number of lines has decreased to eleven lines because the old line 1 has been closed and converted into a passenger waiting room for several intercity trains whose route services terminate at this station.

The station was last renovated in 2019, one of which was the addition of a new waiting area for long-distance trains. As of 23 February 2020, the English railroad switch and station scissors which have been in use for almost fifty years have now been replaced with the latest ones.

Services

Since around 2013-2014 all long and medium distance passenger trains that used to have a terminus to Jakarta Kota Station were diverted to Pasar Senen Station, including the Gumarang Train, Gaya Baru Malam Selatan Train, Tegal Arum Train (now no longer operating), and KA Serayu. The transfer was also carried out to Gambir for Argo Parahyangan train and Gajayana train. Since 9 February 2017 all local train trips to the eastern part of Daop I (Walahar Ekspres/Local Purwakarta and Jatiluhur/Lokal Cikampek) have been moved to Tanjung Priuk Station.

Since May 29  2019, three economy class long and medium distance train trips which originally ended at Pasar Senen Station (KA Jayakarta, Menoreh and Kutojaya Utara), have now been moved to Jakarta Kota Station. With the implementation of Gapeka 2021, on 10 February 2021, the Jayakarta train terminal station was returned to Pasar Senen Station to facilitate long-car train passenger services.

The following is a list of train services at the Jakarta Kota Station.

Passenger services

Kereta Api Indonesia
 Kutojaya Utara to 
 Menoreh to

KAI Commuter

Supporting transportation

TransJakarta

Jakarta MRT

Incidents 

 On December 26, 2014 at 06.30, the CC201 89 07 locomotive crashed into the platform at Jakarta Kota Station, when it was shunting the Argo Parahyangan train circuit. The locomotive was too safe to stop, so it jumped off the rails and then crushed the platform floor. There were no casualties in this incident.

See also

 Rail transport in Indonesia

References

External links

West Jakarta
Colonial architecture in Jakarta
Railway stations in Jakarta
Railway stations opened in 1887
Railway stations opened in 1929
Art Deco architecture in Indonesia
Cultural Properties of Indonesia in Jakarta
Art Deco railway stations